Roberts is an unincorporated community in Fountain County, Indiana, in the United States. An early variant name of the community was Fido.

History
A post office was established at Roberts in 1890 and remained in operation until it was discontinued in 1901.

References

Unincorporated communities in Fountain County, Indiana
Unincorporated communities in Indiana